Tarhe (1742–1818) was a leader of the Wyandot people in the Ohio Country. His nickname was "The Crane". He fought American expansion into the region until the Northwestern Confederacy was defeated at the Battle of Fallen Timbers in 1794. Afterwards, he sought accommodation with the United States.

The Sikorsky CH-54 cargo helicopter is named the "Tarhe" in honor of him.

References

External links
 "Tarhe: Grand Sachem", by C. A. Buser (1978), provided online by the Wyandotte Nation of Oklahoma
 "Tarhe" by Thelma Marsh [c. 1970s], provided online by the Wyandot Nation of Kansas
 Chief Tarhe 

1742 births
1818 deaths
Native American leaders
Native Americans of the Northwest Indian War
Wyandot people